Walker & Ling is a department store in Weston-super-Mare, England. Walker & Ling is an independent store and is a part of the Associated Independent Stores.

The store sells womenswear, including handbags, accessories and lingerie, menswear, cook and housewares, luggage and haberdashery.

The store stocks brands such as: Joules, White Stuff, Seasalt, Superdry, Jack & Jones, Skechers, Triumph, Sloggi and Kipling.

History 
Walker & Ling was established by William Ling and Samuel Walker in Bath in 1892. In 1904, Samuel Walker opened a branch of the now successful drapery business in Weston-super-Mare. His son Charles Walker ('Charlie') became a partner in 1908 and took over sole ownership in 1925 when his father died. The Ling family came out of the partnership in 1936, and Walkers have run the business ever since.

In 1942, with almost 100 staff in the Weston store, the shop was almost entirely destroyed when a 500lb oil bomb hit and burnt most of the northern end of the High Street. It was later redesigned and rebuilt, but the back stock rooms are still original brickwork. After the war, Charles’ sons Peter and Roger joined the business. In 1954 the store celebrated 50 years of trading in Weston. The rebuild of the store was completed in 1959. Tony Walker, then 4 years old, reopened the store. Tony joined the family business in 1973, and the four men worked together until Charles Walker died in June 1976, only a few days before his 90th birthday. Roger retired in 1989 and Peter retired in 1997.

Tony Walker then took on the daily running of the business until 2013 when Tony's son Sam joined the business.

In 2021 the original 1950s mosaic shop front was re-instated as part of the Heritage Action Zone Shop Front Enhancement Scheme in conjunction with Historic England.

References

Weston-super-Mare
Department stores of the United Kingdom